Down Through the Ages is a 1912 American silent film produced by Kalem Company and distributed by General Film Company. It was directed by Sidney Olcott with Gene Gauntier and Jack J. Clark in the leading roles.

Cast
 Gene Gauntier  
 Jack J. Clark

Production notes
The film was shot in Luxor, Egypt.

External links

 Down Through the Ages website dedicated to Sidney Olcott

1912 films
American silent short films
American black-and-white films
Films set in Egypt
Films shot in Egypt
Films directed by Sidney Olcott
1910s American films